Jacob Karlstrøm (born 9 January 1997) is a Norwegian professional footballer who plays for Molde as a goalkeeper.

Career
He signed for Molde on 15 December 2021, for the 2022 season.

Career statistics

References

1997 births
Living people
Norwegian footballers
Tromsø IL players
Molde FK players
Eliteserien players
Norwegian First Division players
Association football goalkeepers